Simon Corbell (born 21 November 1970) is a former Australian politician and Deputy Chief Minister of the Australian Capital Territory. He was also Attorney-General, Minister for Health, Minister for the Environment and Minister for the Capital Metro.

Corbell was first elected to the Australian Capital Territory Legislative Assembly in 1997 as a member for the electorate of Molonglo in a countback following the resignation of former Chief Minister Rosemary Follett. 

On 14 August 2015, Simon Corbell announced his decision to retire from politics at the 2016 Australian Capital Territory general election.

Early life
Corbell grew up in Weston Creek. He attended the local primary and high school before studying at the University of Canberra where he completed a Bachelor of Arts in Communication.

Before his election to the Assembly, Corbell worked for John Langmore, the Member for Fraser in the Australian House of Representatives, until Langmore's departure from parliament.

Political career
As attorney-general, he was involved in the establishment of the Human Rights Act 2004 (ACT) and the Human Rights Commission, and legislating for gay marriage in the ACT after legislation called the Civil Union Act 2006 (of the Australian Capital Territory) was overturned by federal intervention. In 2013, he introduced the bill for the Marriage Equality (Same Sex) Act 2013 (ACT), which the Legislative Assembly passed by a single vote but which was soon overturned in the High Court.

List of ministerial positions held in ACT government
 Deputy Chief Minister (December 2014 - 31 October 2016)
 Attorney-General (20 April 2006 - 31 October 2016)
 Minister for Health (20 January 2015 - 31 October 2016), (23 December 2002 - 20 April 2006)
 Minister for the Environment and Climate Change (May 2011 -31 October 2016)
 Minister for Capital Metro (December 2014 - 30 June 2016)
 Minister for Police and Emergency Services (December 2015 - 31 October 2016)
 Minister for Education, Youth and Family Services (13 November 2001 - 23 December 2002)
 Minister for Energy (10 November 2008 - 16 May 2011)
 Minister for the Environment, Climate Change and Water (10 November 2008 – 16 May 2011)
 Minister for Industrial Relations (13 November 2001 - 23 December 2002)
 Minister for Planning (13 November 2001 - 17 April 2007)
 Minister for Police and Emergency Services (20 April 2006 - December 2014)
 Minister for Sustainable Development (16 May 2011 - December 2014)
 Minister for Workplace Safety and Industrial Relations (9 November 2012 - July 2014)

See also

Marriage Equality (Same Sex) Act 2013 (ACT)

References

External links
 
 

1970 births
Living people
Australian Labor Party members of the Australian Capital Territory Legislative Assembly
Members of the Australian Capital Territory Legislative Assembly
Attorneys-General of the Australian Capital Territory
21st-century Australian politicians